Vincent Tshikaya Tshituka (born  in the Democratic Republic of the Congo) is a Congolese born South African rugby union player for the  in United Rugby Championship. His regular position is flank.

References

South African rugby union players
Living people
1998 births
Rugby union flankers
Golden Lions players
Lions (United Rugby Championship) players
Sharks (rugby union) players
Democratic Republic of the Congo rugby union players